Kiryat Eliezer is a neighborhood in north-western Haifa, Israel, south of Bat Galim.

History
Kiryat Eliezer Stadium, former home to Maccabi Haifa F.C., was located here. The neighborhood is named after Labor Party politician Eliezer Kaplan, who died in 1952, just as  families began to move in.

References

Neighborhoods of Haifa

he:מערב חיפה#קריית אליעזר